Mirza Mohammad Mahdi Karaki was an Iranian cleric and statesman, who served as the grand Vizier of the Safavid king (shah) Abbas II (r. 1642-1666), and the latters son and successor Suleiman I (r. 1666–1694). He was the son of Mirza Habibollah Karaki, who served as the sadr-i mamalik (minister of religion) from 1632/3 till his death 1650.

Sources 

 
 
 
 
 
 
 
 
 

Grand viziers of the Safavid Empire
Politicians from Isfahan
Year of birth unknown
1669 deaths
17th-century people of Safavid Iran